Rafael José García Salamé (born 27 June 2000) is a Spanish professional basketball player for Obradoiro of the Liga ACB.

References

Living people
2000 births
Place of birth missing (living people)
Spanish men's basketball players
Point guards
Obradoiro CAB players
Sportspeople from Granada
21st-century Spanish people